S40 Racing is a freeware game developed by Digital Illusions CE (DICE) and released in October 1997 for the personal computer. The game was made as part of the promotion for the S40 and was shown at a number of large car exhibitions and motor shows in 1987. It has one selectable car and two tracks on which to race, one of which is the Nolby Hills racetrack.

It is based on the same software code as Motorhead (1998). The entire game was completed in fewer than 45 days and sold 16,000 copies through Volvo dealerships throughout Sweden.

References

1997 video games
Advergames
Digital Illusions CE games
Freeware games
Racing simulators
Video games developed in Sweden
Video games scored by Olof Gustafsson
Volvo Cars
Windows games
Windows-only games